Azadegan (also Romanized as Āzādegān; also known as Ebrāhīm Shāh) is a village in Almeh Rural District, Samalqan District, Maneh and Samalqan County, North Khorasan Province, Iran. At the 2006 census, its population was 431, in 131 families.

References 

Populated places in Maneh and Samalqan County